The arrondissement of Sarlat-la-Canéda is an arrondissement in France in the Dordogne department in the Nouvelle-Aquitaine region. It has 136 communes.

Composition

The communes of the arrondissement of Sarlat-la-Canéda, and their INSEE codes, are:

 Ajat (24004)
 Allas-les-Mines (24006)
 Archignac (24012)
 Aubas (24014)
 Audrix (24015)
 Auriac-du-Périgord (24018)
 Azerat (24019)
 La Bachellerie (24020)
 Badefols-d'Ans (24021)
 Bars (24025)
 Beauregard-de-Terrasson (24030)
 Berbiguières (24036)
 Besse (24039)
 Beynac-et-Cazenac (24040)
 Boisseuilh (24046)
 Borrèze (24050)
 Bouzic (24063)
 Le Bugue (24067)
 Calviac-en-Périgord (24074)
 Campagnac-lès-Quercy (24075)
 Campagne (24076)
 Carlux (24081)
 Carsac-Aillac (24082)
 Carves (24084)
 La Cassagne (24085)
 Castelnaud-la-Chapelle (24086)
 Castels et Bézenac (24087)
 Cénac-et-Saint-Julien (24091)
 La Chapelle-Aubareil (24106)
 La Chapelle-Saint-Jean (24113)
 Châtres (24116)
 Chourgnac (24121)
 Cladech (24122)
 Coly-Saint-Amand (24364)
 Condat-sur-Vézère (24130)
 Les Coteaux Périgourdins (24117)
 Coubjours (24136)
 Coux-et-Bigaroque-Mouzens (24142)
 Daglan (24150)
 Doissat (24151)
 Domme (24152)
 La Dornac (24153)
 Les Eyzies (24172)
 Fanlac (24174)
 Les Farges (24175)
 La Feuillade (24179)
 Fleurac (24183)
 Florimont-Gaumier (24184)
 Fossemagne (24188)
 Gabillou (24192)
 Granges-d'Ans (24202)
 Grives (24206)
 Groléjac (24207)
 Hautefort (24210)
 Jayac (24215)
 Journiac (24217)
 Le Lardin-Saint-Lazare (24229)
 Larzac (24230)
 Lavaur (24232)
 Limeuil (24240)
 Limeyrat (24241)
 Loubejac (24245)
 Marcillac-Saint-Quentin (24252)
 Marnac (24254)
 Marquay (24255)
 Mauzens-et-Miremont (24261)
 Mazeyrolles (24263)
 Meyrals (24268)
 Monplaisant (24293)
 Montagnac-d'Auberoche (24284)
 Montignac-Lascaux (24291)
 Nabirat (24300)
 Nadaillac (24301)
 Nailhac (24302)
 Orliac (24313)
 Paulin (24317)
 Pays-de-Belvès (24035)
 Pazayac (24321)
 Pechs-de-l'Espérance (24325)
 Peyrignac (24324)
 Peyzac-le-Moustier (24326)
 Plazac (24330)
 Prats-de-Carlux (24336)
 Prats-du-Périgord (24337)
 Proissans (24341)
 La Roque-Gageac (24355)
 Rouffignac-Saint-Cernin-de-Reilhac (24356)
 Sagelat (24360)
 Saint-André-d'Allas (24366)
 Saint-Aubin-de-Nabirat (24375)
 Saint-Avit-de-Vialard (24377)
 Saint-Cernin-de-l'Herm (24386)
 Saint-Chamassy (24388)
 Saint-Crépin-et-Carlucet (24392)
 Saint-Cybranet (24395)
 Saint-Cyprien (24396)
 Sainte-Eulalie-d'Ans (24401)
 Sainte-Foy-de-Belvès (24406)
 Sainte-Mondane (24470)
 Sainte-Nathalène (24471)
 Sainte-Orse (24473)
 Sainte-Trie (24507)
 Saint-Félix-de-Reillac-et-Mortemart (24404)
 Saint-Geniès (24412)
 Saint-Germain-de-Belvès (24416)
 Saint-Julien-de-Lampon (24432)
 Saint-Laurent-la-Vallée (24438)
 Saint-Léon-sur-Vézère (24443)
 Saint-Martial-de-Nabirat (24450)
 Saint-Pardoux-et-Vielvic (24478)
 Saint-Pompont (24488)
 Saint-Rabier (24491)
 Saint-Vincent-de-Cosse (24510)
 Saint-Vincent-le-Paluel (24512)
 Salignac-Eyvigues (24516)
 Salles-de-Belvès (24517)
 Sarlat-la-Canéda (24520)
 Savignac-de-Miremont (24524)
 Sergeac (24531)
 Simeyrols (24535)
 Siorac-en-Périgord (24538)
 Tamniès (24544)
 Teillots (24545)
 Temple-Laguyon (24546)
 Terrasson-Lavilledieu (24547)
 Thenon (24550)
 Thonac (24552)
 Tourtoirac (24555)
 Tursac (24559)
 Valojoulx (24563)
 Veyrignac (24574)
 Veyrines-de-Domme (24575)
 Vézac (24577)
 Villac (24580)
 Villefranche-du-Périgord (24585)
 Vitrac (24587)

History

The arrondissement of Sarlat-la-Canéda was created in 1800. At the January 2017 reorganisation of the arrondissements of Dordogne, it gained 22 communes from the arrondissement of Périgueux and one commune from the arrondissement of Bergerac.

As a result of the reorganisation of the cantons of France which came into effect in 2015, the borders of the cantons are no longer related to the borders of the arrondissements. The cantons of the arrondissement of Sarlat-la-Canéda were, as of January 2015:

 Belvès
 Le Bugue
 Carlux
 Domme
 Montignac
 Saint-Cyprien
 Salignac-Eyvigues
 Sarlat-la-Canéda
 Terrasson-Lavilledieu
 Villefranche-du-Périgord

References

Sarlat-la-Caneda